Kettle Bottom is a collection of historical poems published in 2004 by Perugia Press in Florence, Massachusetts and written by Diane Gilliam Fisher. The collection's deep focus is on the West Virginia labor battles of 1920 and 1921, such as the Battle of Matewan and Battle of Blair Mountain. Kettle Bottom was named Top Ten Poetry Book for 2005 by American Booksellers Association Book Sense, was winner of the Ohioana Library Association Poetry Book of the Year, was a finalist for the Weatherford Award of the Appalachian Studies Association, and selected for inclusion in The Pushcart Prize XXX: Best of the Small Presses.

Author's Note 
In the Author's Note at the beginning of Kettle Bottom, Fisher explains the cause of the conflict between the West Virginia miners and the company owners and operators: "Subsistence wages, the unwillingness of coal operators to slow production for safety reasons, their intransigence with regard to the rights of the miners to organize—these conditions made enemies of the miners and the operators. The situation was aggravated by the organization of life in the camps, which the companies controlled in every respect. Housing was owned by the company; trade was often limited to company-owned stores; the company brought in the doctor, often built the school and brought in the teacher, built the church and supplied the preacher."

Structure 
Kettle Bottom consists of 50 poems, which are divided into three sections: I. Summer ~ Fall, II. Raven Light, and III. Winter ~ Summer. The collection is structured to read as a narrative; the poems written chronologically into one coherent, suspenseful plot.  "Raven's Light," the only poem in the collection's middle section and the longest poem of all the sections, divides the plot between the time before the miners' rebellion (section I, Summer and Fall) and the time after the miners' rebellion (section III, Winter and Summer).

Language 
Diane Gilliam Fisher shows a mastery of language in this collection. One of the strongest literary devices she employs in her poems is an acute sense of dialect and voice, which not only matches time and place (early 1920s in West Virginia), but also character. Her collection is crafted using persona poems. Each is written specifically from one individual's or character's perspective, although the individual who is a particular poem's narrator varies significantly throughout the collection. This unique ability to go outside herself to capture the personalities and viewpoints of others is shown immediately in Diane Gilliam Fisher's opening poem of Kettle Bottom:

Explosion at Winco No. 9

Delsey Salyer knowed Tom Junior by his toes,

which his steel-toed boots had kept the fire off of.

Betty Rose seen a piece of Willy's ear, the little

notched part where a hound had bit him

when he was a young'un, playing at eating its food.

It is true that it is the men that goes in, but it is us 

that carries the mine inside. It is us that listens 

to what all they are scared of and takes

the weight of it from them, like handing off 

a sack of meal. Us that learns by heart

birthmarks, scars, bends of fingers,

how the teeth set crooked or straight.

Us that picks up the pieces.

I didn't have

nothing to patch with but my old blue dress,

and Ted didn't want flowered goods

on his shirt. I told him, It's just under your arm,

Ted, it ain't going to show.

They brung out bodies,

you couldn't tell. I seen a piece of my old blue dress

on one of them bodies, blacked with smoke,

but I could tell it was my patch, up under the arm.

When the man writing in the big black book

come around asking about identifying marks,

I said, blue dress. I told him, Maude Stanley, 23.

Theme 
The powerful message that Kettle Bottom conveys to its readers is a realization of the horrific history of labor in America and the corruption that circulated during this time, causing dangerous work conditions and inhumane treatment of workers.

Characters 
The characters of Diane Gilliam Fisher's poems range from the children, wives, and family of the coal miners, the immigrant works, the company owners and operators, to the news reporters who were brought in to report on the rebellion. One of the most compelling persona poems in the collection tells the life story of an Italian immigrant who came to America with the dream of becoming an expert stonecutter and architect:

David

At home, in Carrara, Papa he is mastro

di tagliapietra, master stonecutter, maker

of beautiful buildings and bridges. Rich men

they knock on our door, asking licenza

to enter our house, to talk with Papa

about a portico, or a piazza.

Papa he love the stone.

He takes me to see the David, for what

is Michelangelo, he tells me, if not a stonecutter.

La differenza, he says, is that when Papa

sees a stone he sees inside it the face

of a beautiful building. Michelangelo

he sees a beautiful man.

Then he cuts away from the stone

everything that is not David.

Papa wants to come here because America

is a land of beautiful buildings still

hiding in their stones. He believes

be can uncover those buildings,

scoprire la belleza nascosta nella pietra.

When we arrive, he tells the men
with the books -- roccia, pietra—and he makes

the motion of hitting the stone. They point

to a train. When the train stops, they give Papa

not a chisel, but a shovel. He shakes his head, no, 

no, no—but already we owe for the train. 

Papa tries to pay, he goes every day

into the mountain, into the stone. It seals

him in. Sealed in, the men from the company

they tell Mamma the roof it fell, they are sorry.

No survivors, too dangerous to try to bring

the bodies out. The rich men here, they see nothing

in the stone but money. Non c'e nessuno che vede

ill mio papa e gli altri nella pietra. No Michelangelo

here to cut the stone away from the beautiful men. 

By using persona characters such as the Italian immigrant in David, Diane Gilliam Fisher conveys in Kettle Bottom the emotional truth of West Virginia's coal mining history.

References

American poems
Works about Appalachia
Appalachian studies
Works about mining